"Monkey Bars" is a song by Magic Eight Ball, released as a digital single in support of their album Sorry We're Late But We're Worth The Wait.

Music video 
A music video was released by Bravo, Oscar Productions for the single 'Monkey Bars'.

Track listing

Personnel

Musicians 
 Baz Francis - Vocals, guitars and bass 
 Jason Bowld - Drums on 'Monkey Bars' 
 Matthew Colley - Piano on ‘Monkey Bars’ 
 Lewis John - Percussion on 'Rose-Tinted Eyes' 
 Robbie J. Holland - Second bass on 'Rose-Tinted Eyes'

Production 
 Dave Draper - Recording, mixing, mastering, music box programming & producing on 'Monkey Bars'
 Matthew Colley - Additional recording & Piano arrangement on 'Monkey Bars'
 Baz Francis - Production on tracks 1 & 2, recording & arrangements on track 2
 Adam Whalley - Recording, production & arrangements on 'Rose-Tinted Eyes' 
 Lewis John - Mixing, mastering & Production on 'Rose-Tinted Eyes'
 Robbie J. Holland - Production & arrangements on 'Rose-Tinted Eyes'

Art direction 
 Oly Edkins - 'Monkey Bars' music video direction, filming & editing
 Ben Pemberton - 'Monkey Bars' music video direction, filming & editing
 Baz Francis - Single Artwork
 Dave Draper - 'Monkey Bars' music video production

References

External links 

2014 singles
2014 songs